Chicago Board of Trade v. Christie Grain & Stock Co.,  198 U.S. 236  (1905),  was a decision by the  United States Supreme Court,  which upheld sales of  American  grain for future delivery provided for by the rules of the  Chicago Board of Trade  of the state of Illinois. Justice Oliver Wendell Holmes, Jr. delivered the majority opinion of the court, in which he wrote:

People will endeavor to forecast the future and to make agreements according to their prophecy.

See also
List of United States Supreme Court cases, volume 198
Clews v. Jamieson (1901)

Further reading

External links

 

United States Supreme Court cases
United States Supreme Court cases of the Fuller Court
1905 in United States case law
Grain industry of the United States
Grain trade
Chicago Board of Trade litigation